The 2017 FIL European Luge Championships took place under the auspices of the International Luge Federation at Königssee, Germany from 05 to 06 January 2017.

Schedule
Four events will be held.

* Women's Singles 2nd run, delayed due to weather conditions

Medalists

Medal table

References

2017
 
FIL European Luge Championships
FIL European Luge Championships
International luge competitions hosted by Germany
FIL European Luge Championships
Luge
Sports competitions in Bavaria